The Kenya Health Work Force Project is a project to move health informatics in Kenya from a paper system to a computer-based database. They are being assisted by the Georgia Tech Research Institute and the Lillian Carter Center for International Nursing. It is being led by Martha Rogers.

References

Health informatics
Healthcare in Kenya